Conus armadillo is a species of sea snail, a marine gastropod mollusk in the family Conidae, the cone snails and their allies.

Like all species within the genus Conus, these snails are predatory and venomous. They are capable of "stinging" humans, therefore live ones should be handled carefully or not at all.

The subspecies Conus armadillo gabryae L. Raybaudi, 1989 is a synonym of Conus gabryae Röckel & Korn, 1992 in turn a synonym of Conus australis Holten, 1802

Description
The size of the shell varies between 60 mm and 79 mm.

Distribution
This marine species occurs off Taiwan, the Philippines; Queensland, Australia and Papua New Guinea and the Loyalty Islands.

References

 Shikama, T. 1971. On some noteworthy marine Gastropoda from southwestern Japan (III). Science Reports of the Yokohama National University 2 18: 27–35
 Röckel, D., Korn, W. & Kohn, A.J. 1995. Manual of the Living Conidae. Volume 1: Indo-Pacific Region. Wiesbaden : Hemmen 517 pp.
 Tucker J.K. & Tenorio M.J. (2009) Systematic classification of Recent and fossil conoidean gastropods. Hackenheim: Conchbooks. 296 pp
 Puillandre N., Duda T.F., Meyer C., Olivera B.M. & Bouchet P. (2015). One, four or 100 genera? A new classification of the cone snails. Journal of Molluscan Studies. 81: 1–23

External links
 The Conus Biodiversity website
 Cone Shells – Knights of the Sea
 

armadillo
Gastropods described in 1971